Diego Ordóñez Arcauz (7 November 1903 – 14 July 1990) was a Spanish sprinter. He competed at the 1920, 1924 and 1928 Summer Olympics.

References

External links
 

1903 births
1990 deaths
Athletes (track and field) at the 1920 Summer Olympics
Athletes (track and field) at the 1924 Summer Olympics
Athletes (track and field) at the 1928 Summer Olympics
Spanish male sprinters
Olympic athletes of Spain
Athletes from Madrid
Sportspeople from San Sebastián
Athletes from the Basque Country (autonomous community)